Porsche Holding GmbH, also known as Porsche Holding Salzburg, is the largest car distributor in Europe. In 2011, the company was sold by the Porsche family and Porsche SE to Volkswagen AG, which is the majority owner of the company.

History

Porsche Konstruktionen GesmbH was founded by Louise Piëch and Ferry Porsche (daughter and son of Ferdinand Porsche) in 1947 in Gmünd, Austria. After the Porsche 360 Grand Prix racing car was designed by Ferry Porsche with help from the engineers of his father's design office for Cisitalia in 1947, the company started manufacturing the Porsche 356, starting with the prototype Porsche 356/1 and then 356/2 in 1948 at a factory located at a saw mill in Gmünd, and later at a factory in Salzburg.

After Ferdinand Porsche was released from a French prison after the war, the production of the Porsche 356 was taken over by Dr. Ing. h.c. F. Porsche GmbH in Stuttgart, Germany, and the facility in Salzburg became home to Porsche Konstruktionen as the Austrian importer of Volkswagen and Porsche products in 1949. Ferry Porsche joined his father's company in Stuttgart, while the Austrian operation was left with Anton Piëch and Louise Piëch, who managed it to become the largest car dealership chain in Austria by 1957.

By the 1960s, Porsche Konstruktionen became one of the largest distributors of Volkswagen and Porsche products in Europe.

Motorsport

In the late 1960s, Porsche entered many sports cars in races, and to support the factory effort (then calling itself Porsche System Engineering), external semi-factory teams were set up to share the work load. In 1969, Porsche Salzburg became such a de facto second works team, sponsored by Porsche Konstruktionen. Early in the season, at the Nürburgring, cars were entered as Salzburg Porsche Konstruktionen, but later at Austria's Österreichring, it became Porsche Salzburg for short.

Porsche Salzburg became an entrant in the 1969 World Sportscar Championship season and 1970 World Sportscar Championship season, representing Porsche in motorsport. In 1970, the team of John Wyer was the designated factory partner. The Porsche factory itself did not compete anymore, focussing on development, but Salzburg continued. Usually two cars were entered, for Vic Elford and Hans Herrmann. Salzburg operated the winning Porsche 908/3 in the 1000km Nürburgring for that year, and the winning Porsche 917KH at the 1970 24 Hours of Le Mans.  After 1970, the name of Porsche Salzburg disappeared from entry lists, as Martini Racing took over as the second factory-backed team besides Wyer.

Recent developments
In January 2009, Porsche SE became the largest shareholder of Volkswagen AG, and in March 2011, Porsche SE as well as the Porsche and Piëch families sold the ownership in the Austrian company, which had been reorganized into Porsche Holding GmbH (Porsche Holding Salzburg), to Volkswagen AG.

Today, Porsche Holding Salzburg is the largest car distributor in Europe, representing Volkswagen Group brands, including Porsche, in wholesale (as importer), retail (through its dealers), and in the after-sales business (service) in 21 countries in Europe, as well as in South America and in China.

See also
Porsche (disambiguation)

References

Porsche
Porsche in motorsport
Companies based in Salzburg